This article summarizes the events, album releases, and album release dates in hip hop music for the year 2015.

Events

January
On January 5, TMZ reported Chicago-based rap group Hotstylz, were suing Detroit-based rapper Eminem and Shady Records, for the amount of $8 million, for using a 25-second sample of their 2008 single "Lookin' Boy", on his 2013 hit single "Rap God", without crediting them or having their permission.
On January 18, ASAP Mob's founder ASAP Yams, was found dead at the age of 26.
On January 28, Lil Wayne filed a $51 million lawsuit against Birdman and Cash Money Records over the delay of Tha Carter V.
On January 30, Suge Knight was arrested for murder after a fatal hit and run in Compton, California.

February
On February 2, The Jacka died from gunshot wounds sustained in Oakland, California.
On February 19, Charles Hamilton signed a record deal with Republic Records.
On February 28, Lil Boosie was hospitalized for severe dehydration, resulting in cancellation of a show in Charlotte, North Carolina.

March
On March 9, South African rapper Flabba was stabbed to death by his girlfriend in his home. He was 37.
On March 10, Cannibal Ox released "The Blade of the Ronin," their first full-length album since "The Cold Vein"
On March 26, Immortal Technique, along with his manager, were arrested in Santa Ana, California for suspicion of assault and robbery.
On March 27, Lil Durk's manager, OTF Chino, was shot and killed in Chicago, Illinois.

April
On April 11, Nelly was arrested on felony drug charges with possession of marijuana and drug paraphernalia in Putnam County, Tennessee.
On April 18, Offset and Quavo of Migos were arrested on felony drug charges with possession of cocaine, oxycontin, and codeine as well as a felony charge of carrying a loaded gun onto school property during a concert at Georgia Southern University. It was then announced that Offset will be facing additional charges for reportedly fighting in jail.
On April 21, Vic Mensa was signed to Roc Nation.
On April 26, two of Lil Wayne's tour buses were shot at multiple times in Atlanta, Georgia.

May
On May 10, Bow Wow announced he has left Cash Money Records.
On May 17, Chinx and another passenger were shot in Queens while sitting in Chinx's Porsche. They were both rushed to a nearby hospital, where Chinx was pronounced dead.
On May 24, Juicy J was hospitalized for exhaustion, resulting in cancellation of a show in San Francisco, California.
On May 29, Chicago drill rapper Young Pappy was fatally shot in the back. This was the third attempt at Young Pappy's life, as the two prior shooting attempts left bystanders dead.

June
On June 9, Brooklyn rapper Pumpkinhead died.
On June 10, Rick Ross was arrested for marijuana possession, after his Bentley was pulled over in Atlanta, Georgia.
On June 12, YG was shot three times in the hip in Los Angeles, California.
On June 22, Puff Daddy was arrested for assaulting a football coach at University of California, Los Angeles.
On June 24, Rick Ross was arrested for kidnapping, aggravated assault, and aggravated battery charges on a construction worker in Fayette County, Georgia. The same day that Nipsey Hussle was arrested in Los Angeles for possession of codeine.
On June 25, Young Ready was killed in a shooting in Bogalusa, Louisiana.
On June 26, DMX was arrested in New York stemming from a robbery complaint in Newark, New Jersey, and outstanding child support charges.
On June 30, Kidd Kidd was arrested in New York upon arriving for a concert held at the Best Buy Theater. The same day that Scarface was hospitalized in Houston, Texas for an undisclosed reason.

July
On July 2, Young Money Entertainment rapper Flow, was arrested in connection of murder on two men in New Orleans, Louisiana.
On July 3, Young Dolph was arrested prior to a show in Montgomery, Alabama for parole violation.
On July 10, Glo Gang affiliate Capo, was shot in Chicago, Illinois. He was rushed to the Advocate Christ Medical Center where he was pronounced dead. The same day that Hussein Fatal of The Outlawz was killed in a car accident.
On July 13, 50 Cent filed for Chapter 11 bankruptcy protection, subsequently following a $5 million lawsuit in which he was ordered to pay Lastonia Leviston, Rick Ross' baby mother, after leaking a sex tape in which she was featured.
On July 15, Young Thug was arrested in Sandy Springs, Georgia on charges of terroristic threats stemming from an incident at the Perimeter Mall on July 7. The same day DMX was sentenced to six months of jail following his arrest on June 26. and Birdman and Young Thug were alleged by prosecutors of conspiring to murder Lil Wayne and being involved in the April 26th shooting of Lil Wayne's tour bus.
On July 16, Rico Richie was arrested for selling weed and being in possession of firearms. The same day that Young Thug was charged with drugs and weapons charges after police raided his home in Sandy Springs, GA where they seized cocaine, marijuana and automatic weapons. and Birdman filed a $50 million lawsuit against Jay Z's Tidal streaming service, over Lil Wayne's Free Weezy Album. The lawsuit claims that Cash Money Records exclusively owns the rights to Lil Wayne's music.

August
On August 1, Action Bronson cancelled his Osheaga Festival performance in Montreal following the circulation of a petition against his misogynistic and violent lyrics. He was subsequently replaced by Mos Def. 
On August 5, Busta Rhymes was arrested and charged with assault stemming from an altercation with an employee at a New York City gym.
On August 8, Nicholas "Nick Scarfo" Jackson, a rapper from Memphis, Tennessee and a founder of Prophet Entertainment, died at the age of 42. The same day that Sean Price, one half of the duo Heltah Skeltah died at age 43.
On August 10, Tyler, the Creator cancelled the Australian leg of his Cherry Bomb World Tour, following a campaign against the portrayal of women in his music.
On August 17, Birdman was sued for $200,000 by producer DVLP for unpaid production work with Lil Wayne and other Cash Money Records artists.
On August 20, Birdman was sued for $350,000 by Javier Nuno, a former Cash Money Records employee, for unpaid wages of 2 1/2 years between September 2012 to February 2015.
On August 21, Rick Ross was sued for $55,000 by Conexts for failure to promote a Super Bowl party that was scheduled to take place on January 30 in Scottsdale, Arizona.
On August 23, Wiz Khalifa was arrested at LAX in Los Angeles, California for riding a personal hoverboard within the airport.
On August 26, The Game was sued by rapper/designer Ariza Obey for the unlawful use of his photo for his Ryda single artwork. The same day that Tyga was ordered to pay $77,000 in back rent to a former landlord of his Calabasas, California home after failure to appear in court. and Tyler, the Creator announced via Twitter that he has been banned from touring the United Kingdom for 3–5 years due to his lyrical content.
On August 27, Kanye West was awarded $440,000 stemming from a lawsuit after a video of his proposal to Kim Kardashian leaked online without consent.

September
On September 1, Chris Brown was sued after a man sustained injuries stemming from a shooting in a San Jose, California nightclub in January 2015. The same day that Kevin Gates was charged with simple battery after an incident with a fan at a concert held on August 30, 2015 in Lakeland, Florida.
On September 3, Chief Keef was sued for $175,000 after skipping out of a scheduled performance at Auburn University.
On September 26, Fetty Wap was reportedly involved in a motorcycle accident in his hometown of Paterson, New Jersey.

October
On October 4, Action Bronson left a performance in Norway half-way through his set due to medical reasons.
On October 6, Curren$y was awarded $3 million in settlement stemming from a 2012 lawsuit against Damon Dash for releasing two albums without his consent. The same that Missy Elliott was sued for $75,000 for failure to return deposits after the cancellation of two shows in Brazil.
On October 7, 50 Cent sued Garvey Schubert Barer for poor representation stemming from the lawsuit by 'Sleek Audio', in which 50 Cent was ordered to pay $16 million.
On October 9, Scarface was arrested following the taping of the 2015 BET Hip Hop Awards in Atlanta, Georgia stemming from a warrant. The same day that Three 6 Mafia member Koopsta Knicca died of a brain aneurysm at the age of 40.
On October 11, Wiz Khalifa was cited for public urination in his hometown of Pittsburgh, Pennsylvania.
On October 13, Flava Flav pleaded guilty to one count of unlicensed aggravated operation of a motor vehicle stemming from a traffic stop violation in January 2014.
On October 16, Ma$e was served with a tax lien of $41,525.14 to the state of Georgia, his second of 2015.
On October 29, Birdman & Mack Maine were sued over the cover art for the latter's song "Ethan Couch".

November
On November 3, Riff Raff was sued by a former landlord for unpaid rent and property damages.
On November 5, Master P was ordered to pay monthly child ($10,473) and spousal ($16,574) support payments, as well as $200,000 in attorney fees stemming from his divorce settlement case.
On November 10, Lil Wayne was ordered to pay $96,000 to a Pyrotechnics company regarding a non-paid settlement stemming from a purchase made prior to his 2013 tour.
On November 11, Prodigy sued Universal Music for the sum of $57,489 for unlawful distribution of music as well as attorney fees.
On November 20, Peewee Roscoe, Bankroll Mafia member and former Rich Gang affiliate, was sentenced to 20 years in prison for shooting up Lil Wayne's tour bus.
On November 26, Lil Wayne's Trukfit clothing line was sued by model Shanise Taylor for unlawful use of image.

December
On December 23, Chicago rapper King L was shot in the head and survived.

Released albums

Highest-charting singles

Highest first-week consumption

All critically reviewed albums ranked

Metacritic

AnyDecentMusic?

See also
Previous article: 2014 in hip hop music
Next article: 2016 in hip hop music

References

2010s in hip hop music
Hip hop
Hip hop music by year